Judith Wyder (born 25 June 1988) is a Swiss orienteering and ski orienteering competitor and runner.

As a junior, she won World Championship medals in both orienteering and ski orienteering.

She won a bronze medal in the middle distance at the 2011 World Orienteering Championships in Chambéry, a gold medal in the relay at the 2012 World Orienteering Championships in Lausanne and a bronze medal in the relay at the 2013 World Orienteering Championships in Vuokatti.

Wyder had a very strong start to the 2014 season, becoming the dominant Swiss female orienteer after the retirement of Simone Niggli. She dominated the European Orienteering Championships in Portugal where she won gold in both the sprint and in the long distance. She also won the World Cup sprint race ahead of WOC in Italy – a very technical sprint in Imatra, Finland. After that she achieved three gold medals and a bronze medal in the 2014 World Orienteering Championships in Asiago-Lavarone showing her incredible talent.

In 2017, she took a break from competing in Orienteering in order to have her first child.

In 2018, Wyder won a bronze medal in the sprint distance and a silver medal in the sprint relay at the 2018 World Orienteering Championship in Riga.

Wyder began to focus on trail running and skyrunning in 2019. She set a new course record at the DoloMyths Run, finished second at Sierre-Zinal and won the Ring of Steall Skyrace, also in a course record. She then won the Annapurna Trail Marathon which gave her the overall women's victory in the Golden Trail World Series.

References

External links

 

1988 births
Living people
Swiss orienteers
Female orienteers
Foot orienteers
Ski-orienteers
Swiss female long-distance runners
World Orienteering Championships medalists
World Games gold medalists
Competitors at the 2013 World Games
World Games medalists in orienteering
Junior World Orienteering Championships medalists